Senir is a village in Silifke district of Mersin Province, Turkey. It is situated in the Taurus Mountains to the southwest of Göksu River valley. The population of the village was 461 as of 2012. The main economic activities are farming; olive figs and apricots are among the crops.

References

Villages in Silifke District